Trickster Arts is an indie game development team based in the Czech Republic. It consists of former 2K Czech employees.

History 
The studio was founded in Fall 2012 when Matouš Ježek left 2K Czech and started to work on his own game. The project was titled Hero. Ježek also contacted some of his friends and former colleagues to join his team. It included Ladislav Týč and Matúš Široký. They also released an iOS game Date Me If You Can. Its Czech version Interande was, unlike the English version, a success.

The project Hero (renamed to Hero of Many) was in  development for 10 months and was released in June 2013 to very positive response from critics. The game was also a minor financial success that allowed Trickster Arts to start works on another project. This new project was an unnamed action adventure in which the player controlled Fire. This was a much bigger project than Hero of Many but the development was eventually stopped after a year, as the game was too difficult for development and too expensive. Trickster Arts then decided to make a game about Hacking

In November 2012, Matouš Ježek, the CEO was present at Game Developers Session, where he talked about the team and its experiences with the development.

Trickster Arts announced its new game Hackers in April 2016 at Game Access Conference in Brno. Hackers was released on 19 September 2016. The game was downloaded by more than 1 million players after one Month.

Studio announced its next game Action RPG Monolisk on 31 May 2019. The game was released on 15 October 2019.

Released titles

References

External links 
Official Site

Video game companies of the Czech Republic
Video game companies established in 2012
Video game development companies
Companies based in Prague
2012 establishments in the Czech Republic